Scopula lactea is a moth of the family Geometridae. It was described by William Warren in 1900. It is endemic to Kenya.

Taxonomy
Scopula lactea is a junior secondary homonym of Lycauges lactea described by Arthur Gardiner Butler in 1879 and requires a replacement name.

References

Endemic moths of Kenya
Moths described in 1900
lactea
Endemic fauna of Kenya
Moths of Africa
Taxa named by William Warren (entomologist)